Frank Montgomery may refer to:

Frank Montgomery (director) (1870–1944), American film actor and director
Frank Montgomery (footballer), Northern Irish footballer
Frank A. Montgomery (1830–1903), American Army officer
Frank Ulrich Montgomery, German radiologist

See also
Frank Montgomery School, in England